The honey badger (Mellivora capensis), also known as the ratel ( or ), is a mammal widely distributed in Africa, Southwest Asia, and the Indian subcontinent. Because of its wide range and occurrence in a variety of habitats, it is listed as Least Concern on the IUCN Red List.

It is the only living species in the genus Mellivora and in the mustelid subfamily Mellivorinae. Despite its name, the honey badger does not closely resemble other badger species; instead, it bears more anatomical similarities to weasels. It is primarily a carnivorous species and has few natural predators because of its thick skin, strength and ferocious defensive abilities.

Taxonomy 
Viverra capensis was the scientific name used by Johann Christian Daniel von Schreber in 1777 who described a honey badger skin from the Cape of Good Hope. Mellivorae was proposed as name for the genus by Gottlieb Conrad Christian Storr in 1780.
Mellivorina was proposed as a tribe name by John Edward Gray in 1865.

The honey badger is the only species of the genus Mellivora. Although in the 1860s it was assigned to the badger subfamily, the Melinae, it is now generally agreed that it bears few similarities to the Melinae. It is much more closely related to the marten subfamily, Guloninae, and furthermore is assigned its own subfamily, Mellivorinae. Differences between Mellivorinae and Guloninae include differences in their dentition formulae. Though not in the same subfamily as the wolverines, which are a genus of large-sized and atypical Guloninae, the honey badger can be regarded as another, analogous, form of outsized weasel or polecat.

Evolution 

The species first appeared during the middle Pliocene in Asia. A number of extinct relatives are known dating back at least 7 million years to the Late Miocene. These include Mellivora benfieldi from South Africa and Italy, Promellivora from Pakistan, and Howellictis from Chad. More distant relatives include Eomellivora, which evolved into several different species in both the Old and New World, and the giant, long-legged Ekorus from Kenya.

Subspecies 

In the 19th and 20th centuries, 16 zoological specimens of the honey badger were described and proposed as subspecies.
, 12 subspecies are recognised as valid taxa. Points taken into consideration in assigning different subspecies include size and the extent of whiteness or greyness on the back.

Description 

The honey badger has a fairly long body, but is distinctly thick-set and broad across the back. Its skin is remarkably loose, and allows the animal to turn and twist freely within it. The head is small and flat, with a short muzzle. The eyes are small, and the ears are little more than ridges on the skin, another possible adaptation to avoiding damage while fighting.

The honey badger has short and sturdy legs, with five toes on each foot. The feet are armed with very strong claws, which are short on the hind legs and remarkably long on the forelimbs. It is a partially plantigrade animal whose soles are thickly padded and naked up to the wrists. The tail is short and is covered in long hairs, save for below the base.

The honey badger is the largest terrestrial mustelid in Africa. Females are smaller than males. In Africa, males weigh  while females weigh  on average. This positions it as the third largest known badger, after the European badger and hog badger, and fourth largest extant terrestrial mustelid after additionally the wolverine.

There are two pairs of mammae. The honey badger possesses an anal pouch which, unusual among mustelids, is eversible, a trait shared with hyenas and mongooses. The smell of the pouch is reportedly "suffocating", and may assist in calming bees when raiding beehives.

The skull greatly resembles a larger version of that of a marbled polecat.
The dental formula is: . The teeth often display signs of irregular development, with some teeth being exceptionally small, set at unusual angles or absent altogether. Honey badgers of the subspecies signata have a second lower molar on the left side of their jaws, but not the right. Although it feeds predominantly on soft foods, the honey badger's cheek teeth are often extensively worn. The canine teeth are exceptionally short for carnivores. The papillae of the tongue are sharp and pointed, which assists in processing tough foods.

Hairs are even sparser on the flanks, belly and groin. The sides of the head and lower body are pure black. A large white band covers the upper body, from the top of the head to the base of the tail. Honey badgers of the cottoni subspecies are unique in being completely black.

Distribution and habitat

The honey badger ranges through most of sub-Saharan Africa, from the Western Cape, South Africa, to southern Morocco and southwestern Algeria and outside Africa through Arabia, Iran, and Western Asia to Turkmenistan and the Indian Peninsula.

Behaviour and ecology 

The honey badger is mostly solitary, but has also been sighted in Africa to hunt in pairs during the breeding season in May. It also uses old burrows of aardvark, warthog and termite mounds.
It is a skilled digger, able to dig tunnels into hard ground in 10 minutes.

The honey badger is notorious for its strength, ferocity and toughness. It is known to savagely and fearlessly attack almost any other species when escape is impossible, reportedly even repelling much larger predators such as lion and hyena. Bee stings, porcupine quills, and animal bites rarely penetrate their skin. If horses, cattle, or Cape buffalos intrude upon a honey badger's burrow, it will attack them.In the Cape Province it is a potential prey species of the African leopard. African rock pythons,

Diet 

The honey badger has the least specialised diet of the weasel family next to the wolverine. It accesses a large part of its food by digging it out of burrows.
It often raids beehives in search of both bee larvae and honey. It also feeds on insects, frogs, tortoises, turtles, lizards, rodents, snakes, birds and eggs. It also eats berries, roots and bulbs. When foraging for vegetables, it lifts stones or tears bark from trees. Some individuals have even been observed to chase away lion cubs from kills. It devours all parts of its prey, including skin, hair, feathers, flesh and bones, holding its food down with its forepaws. It feeds on a wide range of vertebrates and seems to subsist primarily on small vertebrates. Honey badgers studied in Kgalagadi Transfrontier Park preyed largely on geckos and skinks (47.9% of prey species), gerbils and mice (39.7% of prey). The bulk of its prey comprised species weighing more than  such as cobras, young African rock python and South African springhare.
In the Kalahari, honey badgers were also observed to attack domestic sheep and goats, as well as kill and eat black mambas. A honey badger was suspected to have broken up the shells of tent tortoises in the Nama Karoo. In India, honey badgers are said to dig up human corpses.

Despite popular belief, there is no evidence that honeyguides guide the honey badger.

Reproduction 
Little is known of the honey badger's breeding habits. Its gestation period is thought to last six months, usually resulting in two cubs, which are born blind. Its lifespan in the wild is unknown, though captive individuals have been known to live for approximately 24 years. The voice of the honey badger is a hoarse "khrya-ya-ya-ya" sound. When mating, males emit loud grunting sounds. Cubs vocalise through plaintive whines. When confronting dogs, honey badgers scream like bear cubs.

Relationships with humans 
Honey badgers often become serious poultry predators. Because of their strength and persistence, they are difficult to deter. They are known to rip thick planks from hen-houses or burrow underneath stone foundations. Surplus killing is common during these events, with one incident resulting in the death of 17 Muscovy ducks and 36 chickens.

Because of the toughness and looseness of their skin, honey badgers are very difficult to kill with dogs. Their skin is hard to penetrate, and its looseness allows them to twist and turn on their attackers when held. The only safe grip on a honey badger is on the back of the neck. The skin is also tough enough to resist several machete blows. The only sure way of killing them quickly is through a blow to the skull with a club or a shot to the head with a gun, as their skin is almost impervious to arrows and spears.

During the British occupation of Basra in 2007, rumours of "man-eating badgers" emerged from the local population, including allegations that these beasts were released by the British troops, something that the British categorically denied. A British army spokesperson said that the badgers were "native to the region but rare in Iraq" and "are usually only dangerous to humans if provoked".

The honey badger has also been reported to dig up human corpses in India.
In Kenya, the honey badger is a major reservoir of rabies and is suspected to be a significant contributor to the sylvatic cycle of the disease.

References

Further reading

External links 

Weasels
Carnivorans of Africa
Mammals of Africa
Mammals of South Asia
Mammals of the Middle East
Mammals of Central Asia
Tool-using mammals
honey badger
Extant Pliocene first appearances